Sukhoy Log (lit. dry gully) is a town and the administrative center of Sukholozhsky District in Sverdlovsk Oblast, Russia, located on the eastern slopes of the Ural Mountains on the Pyshma River (Ob's basin),  east of Yekaterinburg, the administrative center of the oblast. As of the 2010 Census, its population was 34,554.

History
It was founded in 1710 as the sloboda of Sukholozhskaya. In 1847, coal deposits were prospected in the vicinity, and the village served as a coal mining center until the 1860s. Urban-type settlement status was granted to Sukhoy Log in 1932 and town status in 1943.

Administrative and municipal status
Within the framework of administrative divisions, Sukhoy Log serves as the administrative center of Sukholozhsky District. As an administrative division, it is incorporated within Sukholozhsky District as the Town of Sukhoy Log. As a municipal division, the town of Sukhoy Log is, together with all twenty-five rural localities in Sukholozhsky District, incorporated as Sukhoy Log Urban Okrug.

References

Notes

Sources

Cities and towns in Sverdlovsk Oblast